Lymantica leucophaes is a moth of the  family Erebidae. It is found in eastern Madagascar.

The forewings of this species are white, with 6 prominent russet patches along the costa and traces of 3 fasciae of russet. 
Hindwings are russet with whitish towards the base.

The expanse of the males is 38 mm.

References

Lymantriinae
Moths described in 1936
Moths of Madagascar
Moths of Africa